Citizenship of South Korea is granted to qualifying individuals under the South Korean Nationality Act and its fifteen amendments. Citizenship status reflects the rights, duties, and identity of individuals in relation to the South Korean state.

There are elements of the jus sanguinis principle of citizenship acquisition in South Korean nationality law, as citizenship inheritance is possible for those with a blood relationship to ethnic Koreans. However, the stringency of this standard has been complicated by politics, the effects of globalization, as well as historical patterns of migration. Maintaining the balance between the supposed homogeneity of South Korean society and the discourse of progress has proven somewhat tenuous. Despite this, the pliability of citizenship policies in recent years seems to indicate a larger trend that welcomes the addition of select foreigners.

The unique history of Korea, including its division and colonization, have impacted the context in which citizenship is interpreted. Because of this, the year that the South Korean state was established has figured prominently in determining the legitimacy of South Korean nationality, as there was no such thing until 1948. South Korean identity has been formed in reaction to violence and occupation, and the legislative approach to determining who is worthy of belonging has reflected this. Those who are included and excluded from the benefits of citizenship reflect not just the relations between people living in South Korea, but also the South Korean state's relationship to outsiders more broadly.

Terminology 
Citizens, or members of the South Korean state, are often referred to through the discourse of kungmin. This term was inherited by Koreans from the Japanese, whose concept of kokumin is a translation of the German staatsvolk. Kokumin is characterized by philosophies of loyalty to the state and its leader as opposed to sovereignty over a state by an ethnic group (as in the German staatsvolk). Because of its etymological roots, there has been a persistent tension between notions of duty and rights for kungmin.

Citizenship (siminkwon) and nationality (kukchok) may be referred to interchangeably in the South Korean context due to a blurriness between these concepts both in legislation and culture.

History

1948-1997: Post-Republic of Korea 
From the point that the South Korean state was established in 1948 until the late 1990s, the primary means of acquiring South Korean citizenship was based on paternal lineage—any child born to a Korean father was granted citizenship. This tradition is based on the principle of jus sanguinis a patre. In 1997, the Republic of Korea Nationality Law Amendment extended the qualifications for Korean citizenship so that any child born to a Korean parent may acquire South Korean nationality at birth, regardless of the parent's sex. This amendment sought to address the problem of gender inequality in the previous Nationality Law, a concession that the Kim Young-Sam administration planned to reach parity with international standards and bolster transnational relations.

Following the allowance of non-gendered citizenship inheritance from parents, new barriers were put in place in the aim of limiting foreigners’ acquisition of South Korean citizenship. Naturalization through marriage, which was once granted automatically to foreign wives of Korean men, was given stricter criteria. Through an additional amendment to the Nationality Law in 1997, applicants for naturalization on the basis of marriage to a South Korean citizen would first need to establish residency for two years.

1998-2007: Reactions to expanding citizenship 
Between 1998 and 2004, there were a series of limitations put on citizenship rights and naturalization in an effort to allay public opinion regarding the many privileges of South Korean citizenship afforded to overseas Koreans and other foreigners. In 2005, Military Service Law was extended to require service by all male citizens, regardless of whether they were permanent residents in another country. To be released from military obligation, Korean men were required to renounce their South Korean citizenship. However, many concessions have since been made in service of advancing the economic interests of South Korea. In 2007, legislation was introduced to allow high-skilled foreigners to obtain D-10 visas. Prior to this, foreigners were required to secure employment in South Korea to be deemed eligible for a visa.

2010-2018: The contemporary global era 
In 2010, a new amendment offered South Korean citizenship to talented foreigners, regardless of ethnic background, without the residency requirements for those seeking naturalization through marriage. Similarly, between 2011 and 2016, several amendments were made that would allow South Korean citizens to maintain multiple citizenships–a dispensation which was expressly prohibited in the years prior. Despite the absence of ethnic requirements in recent nationality law amendments, opportunities for flexible citizenship tend to attract affluent and highly educated foreigners and Korean Americans. Those seeking naturalization through marriage tend to be women and ethnic minorities. In this way, eligibility for South Korean citizenship remains fraught along ethnic, gender, and class lines.

Because international standards for human rights directly impact domestic politics, the political practicality of offering citizenship rights to migrants is growing steadily. Advocacy groups representing the interests of undocumented people continue to push for the protection and dignity of migrants under the state. However, this sentiment is not universal as nativism is on the rise in South Korea–this has been attributed to the erosion of citizens' rights in the name of market fundamentalism.

Nationality Law 
The Constitution of South Korea entrusts the National Assembly with the responsibility of establishing laws which govern citizenship. The Nationality Act of 1948 was the first piece of legislation enacted by the National Assembly which established the boundaries for acquisition of South Korean citizenship. Since its enactment, the Nationality Act has since been amended fifteen times.

Act on Immigration and Legal Status of Overseas Koreans of 1999 
In 1999, the Act on Immigration and Legal Status of Overseas Koreans officially established the relationship of overseas Koreans (chaeoe tongp’o) to the South Korean State in legal terms. This law virtually granted dual citizenship rights—to work, to stay in the country for a prolonged period, to own property—to certain groups of diasporic Koreans, such as those residing in Japan and Korean Americans.

While this Act appears to indicate an openness to the inclusion of overseas Koreans generally, over fifty percent of this population was initially excluded from receiving the benefits of South Korean citizenship. This was due to criteria in the law which deemed the nationalities of many Korean Chinese and Korean Russians unverifiable. The heritage and identities of those whose ancestors migrated away from Korea prior to the establishment of the South Korean state in 1948 were regarded as particularly precarious.

The provision in the original version of this law which excluded some overseas Koreans was considered controversial both in South Korea and around the world, which resulted in the Constitutional Court ordering the revision of the act in accordance with the “equality principle” of the South Korean Constitution. Of course, even as problematic verbiage in the Overseas Korean Act was discarded in 2004, there remain practical issues associated with this law that continue to limit certain overseas Koreans’ South Korean citizenship rights.

Controversies 
Scholars have argued that citizenship is not a fixed status that can be achieved, but rather an ongoing project that changes over time. Because of this tension between notions of stability and fluidity, the concept of citizenship is a site of struggle. South Korea's struggles with recognizing and classifying who should qualify for citizenship reflect both the plasticity of national identities and geographical boundaries. Because exclusivity and exclusion are inherently tied to notions of citizenship, this means that not only are migrants shaped by their reception in a new polity, but citizens too are shaped by determinations of belonging. To this extent, citizens and non-citizens are thought to be formed through a mutually constitutive process in reaction to the policies of the state.

See also 

 South Korean nationality law
 Constitution of South Korea
National Assembly (South Korea)
 Immigration to South Korea
 Foreigners in Korea
South Korean passport
 Illegal immigration to South Korea

References 

South Korean nationality law